Rob Webber (born 1 August 1986) is a former rugby union player. Webber's position of choice was as at hooker and he could also play in the back-row.  He is currently head coach at Jersey Reds.

Club career
He played for Leeds Carnegie in the 2004–05 European Challenge Cup. Webber joined London Wasps ahead of the 2005–06 season.

After initially breaking into the Wasps team as an open-side flanker, Webber established himself as the club's first choice hooker during the 2008–09 season. His form in the 2009–10 season saw him made Wasps captain during the absence of Tom Rees, and in March 2010 he agreed a new two-year deal with the club.

In January 2012 he signed with Bath Rugby a three-year deal starting from the 2012–13 season.

On 1 February 2016, Webber has signed for rivals Sale Sharks on a two-year deal from the 2016–17 season.

In March 2020 Webber announced he would be leaving Sale Sharks at the end of the season to take up a role as forwards coach at Jersey Reds. Following the departure of Ed Robinson, in July 2021 Webber was promoted to the role of Head Coach ahead of season 2021-22.

International career
Webber represented England at U16, U18 and U19 level. He competed for England at the 2006 Under 21 Rugby World Championship.

He represented England at the 2008 London Sevens.

Rob Webber was a member of the England Saxons squad that participated in the 2008 Churchill Cup, although he did not take the field.

He made his England Saxons debut against , then started all three games at the 2009 Churchill Cup.

Webber was a member of the Senior England squad for the 2010 Summer tour of Australasia, playing against the New Zealand Māori.

References

External links
Wasps profile
England Profile

1986 births
Living people
Bath Rugby players
England international rugby union players
English rugby union players
Leeds Tykes players
People educated at Pocklington School
Rugby union hookers
Rugby union players from York
Wasps RFC players
Sale Sharks players